The 2018–19 Sydney Thunder Women's season was the fourth in the team's history. Coached by Joanne Broadbent and captained by Alex Blackwell, the Thunder finished second in the regular season of WBBL04 and qualified for the playoffs. In an "incredible" semi-final, notable for a catch taken by Haidee Birkett on the last ball of the game to dismiss Nicola Carey, Sydney suffered a four-run defeat at the hands of the Brisbane Heat and were consequently eliminated from the tournament. It was thus the second-straight year in which they lost a knockout game to a lower-ranked opponent.

Squad 
Each 2018–19 squad featured 15 active players, with an allowance of up to five marquee signings including a maximum of three from overseas. Under a new rule, Australian marquees were classed as players who held a national women's team contract at the time of signing on for their WBBL|04 team.

The Thunder made just one change to their squad from the previous season, adding Saskia Horley as their only new inclusion. Indian marquee Harmanpreet Kaur returned for her third campaign with the Thunder, but she was unavailable to play the first match and the semi-final due to national team commitments. In November 2019, the recurring issue of conflicting schedules with overseas players prompted newly appointed Cricket Australia board member Mel Jones to call for greater cooperation between nations to give the league a clearer window.

The table below lists the Thunder players and their key stats (including runs scored, batting strike rate, wickets taken, economy rate, catches and stumpings) for the season.

Ladder

Fixtures 
All times are local time

Regular season 

The Thunder were catapulted to a score of 5/179 by a late 49-run partnership between Harmanpreet Kaur and Stafanie Taylor (which included 21 runs off the 18th over against the bowling of Taneale Peschel, who had taken 1/12 in her first three overs). Eight overs into the second innings, Meg Lanning had scored 71 of the Scorchers' 83 runs. Although Lanning was run out for 76 in the tenth over, Elyse Villani went on to score 66 not out, guiding the Scorchers to a six-wicket victory with one ball remaining. In doing so, the Scorchers set a new WBBL record for highest successful run chase.

Responding to the Thunder's first innings total of 7/171, Heat opener Beth Mooney recorded her maiden WBBL century but was then dismissed in the 17th over. With Brisbane still requiring 19 runs off the last twelve balls, Harmanpreet Kaur—having already claimed two wickets, including the stumping of Mooney, for just ten runs—came on to bowl her third over. The Heat, primarily through Delissa Kimmince, scored 13 runs off the over to swing the momentum once more. Laura Harris then hit the winning runs against the bowling of Nicola Carey with three wickets in hand and three balls remaining, making it Brisbane's highest successful run chase. The result helped to set up a semi-final encounter between the two teams on the following weekend.

Knockout stage 

The lower-ranked Heat posted a first innings total of 7/140, recovering from 5/78 after 12 overs through an unbeaten knock of 32 from 25 by Laura Harris. After struggling through the middle overs of the run chase, a late charge by the Thunder brought the hosts back into the contest to leave a required five runs off the final delivery for victory. The last ball, sent down by spinner Jess Jonassen, was struck flat and cleanly to deep square leg by batter Nicola Carey. Jonassen immediately signalled disappointment as the ball set sail for beyond the boundary rope, therefore scoring six runs and clinching the match for Sydney... However, Brisbane fielder Haidee Birkett made enough ground in time to take a "miracle" catch just inside the field of play to knock the Thunder out of the tournament. The match, in conjunction with the other semi-final played later in the day, was hailed as a showcase of "the irrefutable rise of women's cricket" and "sport with drama, skill and unpredictability – a potent recipe for success".

Statistics and awards 

 Most runs: Rachael Haynes – 376 (8th in the league)
 Highest score in an innings: Rachael Haynes – 68* (48) vs Hobart Hurricanes, 24 December 2018
 Most wickets: Stafanie Taylor – 19 (equal 5th in the league)
 Best bowling figures in an innings: Rene Farrell – 3/12 (4 overs) vs Adelaide Strikers, 15 December 2018
 Most catches (fielder): Nicola Carey – 8 (equal 5th in the league)
 Player of the Match awards:
 Stafanie Taylor – 2
 Alex Blackwell, Nicola Carey, Rene Farrell, Lisa Griffith, Rachael Haynes, Harmanpreet Kaur – 1 each
 Alex Blackwell Medal: Rachel Priest
 WBBL|04 Team of the Tournament: Stafanie Taylor

References

Notes 

2018–19 Women's Big Bash League season by team
Sydney Thunder (WBBL)